Ennedi Est Region is one of the twenty-three regions of Chad. The capital of the region is Am-Djarass. The region's current governor is General Hassan Djorobo.

History
It was established in 2012 from part of the former Ennedi Region. It appears to cover the same territory as the former Ennedi Est Department.

Geography
The region borders Libya to the north, Sudan to the east, Wadi Fira Region to the south, and Ennedi-Ouest Region to the west. The region is geographically part of the Sahara Desert.

The region's northern border lies within the Aouzou Strip, historically a point of dispute between Chad and Libya.

Settlements
Am-Djarass is the regional capital; other major settlements include Bahaï, Bao Billiat, Kaoura and Mourdi.

Demographics
The main ethnolinguistic groups are the Dazaga Toubou and the Zaghawa.

Subdivisions
Ennedi Est Region is divided into two departments:

References

Regions of Chad
 
States and territories established in 2012